Ivo Petović (born 26 September 1963) is a Montenegrin professional basketball coach and former player.

Early life 
Petović was born in 1963 to a Montenegrin Croat family from Muo at the Bay of Kotor.

Professional career
During his playing days, Petović played for domestic teams Budućnost and Crvena zvezda, and the Greek team AEK Athens. Afterward, he played in Luxembourg, Sweden, Portugal, Slovakia, Russia, Tunisia, Macedonia, Switzerland, and Romania. He retired as a player in 1999.

National team career 
Petović was a member of the Yugoslavia cadet team at the 1981 European Championship for Cadets in Greece. Over seven tournament games, he averaged 6.7 points per game.

Petović was a member of the Yugoslavia junior (under-18) team that won the silver medal at the 1982 European Championship for Juniors in Bulgaria. Over six tournament games, he averaged 5.2 points per game. He also was a member of the Junior (under-19) national team at the 1983 World Championship for Juniors in Palma de Mallorca, Spain. Over eight tournament games, he averaged 7 points per game.

Coaching career 
In 2000, Petović established KK Stars, a youth academy based in his hometown, where he coaches youth.

See also 
 List of KK Crvena zvezda players with 100 games played

References

External links
 Ivo Petović at registar.treneri.me

1963 births
Living people
AEK B.C. players
Centers (basketball)
Croats of Montenegro
KK Budućnost players
KK Crvena zvezda players
Montenegrin expatriate basketball people in Greece
Montenegrin expatriate basketball people in Serbia
Montenegrin basketball coaches
Montenegrin men's basketball players
People from Kotor
Power forwards (basketball)
Yugoslav men's basketball players